Mississippi's 1st congressional district is in the northeast corner of the state. It includes much of the northern portion of the state including Columbus, Oxford, Southaven, Tupelo and West Point. The  University of Mississippi (Ole Miss), is located within the district.

The district includes Alcorn, Benton, Calhoun, Chickasaw, Choctaw, Clay, DeSoto, Itawamba, Lafayette, Lee, Lowndes, Marshall, Monroe, Pontotoc, Prentiss, Tate, Tippah, Tishomingo, Union, Webster, and Winston counties and a portion of Oktibbeha County.

From statehood to the election of 1846, Mississippi elected representatives at-large statewide on a general ticket.

The congressional seat has been held by Republican Trent Kelly who won a June, 2015 special election to fill the vacant seat previously held by Republican Alan Nunnelee who died February 6, 2015.  In the November 2010 election, Nunnelee had defeated Democratic incumbent Travis Childers, Constitutionalist Gail Giaramita, Independent Conservative Party candidate Wally Pang of Batesville, Libertarian Harold Taylor, and Reformist Barbara Dale Washer.

Election results from presidential races

List of members representing the district

Recent election results

2012

2014

2015 special election

2016

2018

2020

2022

Historical district boundaries

See also

Mississippi's congressional districts
List of United States congressional districts

References

Further reading

 Congressional Biographical Directory of the United States 1774–present

01
Constituencies established in 1847
1847 establishments in Mississippi
Constituencies disestablished in 1860
1860 disestablishments in Mississippi
Constituencies established in 1870
1870 establishments in Mississippi